Lebed is a village in Dzhebel Municipality, Kardzhali Province, southern Bulgaria.

Honours
Lebed Point on Clarence Island, Antarctica is named after the village.

References

Villages in Kardzhali Province